Leonid Vershinin (born 23 June 1977) is a Belarusian hurdler. He competed in the men's 400 metres hurdles at the 2000 Summer Olympics.

References

1977 births
Living people
Athletes (track and field) at the 2000 Summer Olympics
Belarusian male hurdlers
Olympic athletes of Belarus
Place of birth missing (living people)